Timur, Temur, Temür, Temir or Tömör is a masculine Turkic and Mongolic given name which literally means iron. It is a cognate of the Bosnian and Turkish name Demir. In Indonesian, timur translates to east, and symbolizes hope by the rising sun.

Timur is also a popular name for boys in post-Soviet states, due in part to its usage in the novel Timur and His Squad by Arkady Gaidar.

Notable people with the name include:

People with the given name

Historical
 Möngke Temür (d.1280), khan of the Golden Horde
 Several rulers from the Chinese-Mongol Yuan Dynasty.
 Temür Khan ( 1294–1307), the second ruler of the Yuan dynasty
 Tugh Temür, better known as Jayaatu Khan, Emperor Wenzong of Yuan ( 1328–1332)
 Toghon Temür ( 1333–1370)
 Uskhal Khan Tögüs Temür ( 1378–1388)
 Yesün Temür ( 1323–1328) 
 Öljei Temür Khan, ( 1408–1412)
 Köke Temür, a Yuan dynasty general
 Timur (1336–1405), a Central Asian ruler also known as Tamerlane.
 Timur II real name Neku Siyar (b. 1679d. 1723) was a (De facto) Mughal emperor.
 Bayan Temür (King Gongmin of Goryeo)
 Khan Temir ( 1637), a Budjak Nogais ruler
 Timur Shah Durrani (1746–1793), an Afghan ruler
 Tughlugh Timur (d.1363), khan of the Chagatai Khanate/Moghulistan

Modern
 Temur Babluani (born 1948), a Georgian film director
 Timur Beg, (d. 1933), a Uyghur rebel leader
 Timur Bekmambetov, Kazakh film and advertisement director
 Timur Dibirov (born 1983), a Russian handball player
 Timur Dzhabrailov, Russian footballer
 Timur Frunze, Russian fighter pilot
 Timur Gareev, Uzbekistani chess player
 Timur Ibragimov, Uzbekistani boxer
 Temur Iakobashvili (born 1967), Georgian politician and diplomat
 Temur Juraev (born 1984), Uzbekistani football player
 Timur Kapadze, Uzbekistani footballer
 Temur Ketsbaia (born 1968), Georgian football player and manager
 Timur Kuran, American academic
 Timur Yunusov, Russian singer
 Timur Miroshnychenko, a Ukrainian TV presenter
 Timur Mutsurayev (born 1976), Chechen singer and bard
 Timur Taymazov (born 1970), a Ukrainian weightlifter
 Timur Kulibayev, Kazakh billionaire 
 Teimour Radjabov (born 1987), an Azerbaijani chess player
 Timur Rodriguez, Russian showman, singer, TV and radio personality
 Timur Selçuk, Turkish musician
 Timur Tekkal, German rugby union player
 Timur Yanyali, Turkish footballer

Surname 

 Timur (disambiguation)
 Amur and Timur, a tiger and goat in Russia
 Bar Timor (born 1992), Israeli basketball player
 Daramyn Tömör-Ochir
 Minarti Timur, Chinese-Indonesian badminton player
 Mahmut Temür, (born 1989) a German football player

See also 
Timofey
Turkmens people
Hazaras people
Mughal Empire
East Timor

Mongolian given names
Turkic masculine given names
Kazakh masculine given names
Russian masculine given names